is the second mini-album released by the Japanese girl group Morning Musume, under the name of their 20th anniversary group, Morning Musume 20th. It was released in Japan on February 7, 2018, with two versions: a limited CD+DVD edition and a regular CD-only edition.

Featured lineup

Morning Musume 20th 
 1st generation: Yuko Nakazawa, Aya Ishiguro, Kaori Iida, Natsumi Abe, Asuka Fukuda
 9th generation: Mizuki Fukumura, Erina Ikuta
 10th generation: Haruna Iikubo, Ayumi Ishida, Masaki Sato
 11th generation: Sakura Oda
 12th generation: Haruna Ogata, Miki Nonaka, Maria Makino, Akane Haga
 13th generation: Kaede Kaga, Reina Yokoyama
 14th generation: Chisaki Morito

Morning Musume OG 
 2nd generation: Mari Yaguchi (track 2)
 4th generation: Hitomi Yoshizawa (track 2), Nozomi Tsuji (DVD track 10)
 5th generation: Ai Takahashi (track 2; DVD tracks 6, 7), Risa Niigaki (track 2)
 6th generation: Miki Fujimoto (track 2), Sayumi Michishige (track 2; DVD tracks 6, 7, 9), Reina Tanaka (DVD tracks 6, 7)
 10th generation: Haruka Kudo (track 7, 8; DVD tracks 6, 7, 10, 12, 13)

Track listing

Rank and Sales

References 

2018 albums
Morning Musume albums
Zetima albums
Japanese-language albums
Albums produced by Tsunku
Dance-pop albums by Japanese artists
Electropop albums